Tulika Publishers is a South Indian Multi-lingual Children's Books publishing house.
 It often uses the imprint Tulika Books, but is separate from the New Delhi-based publisher Tulika Books.

History
Tulika was founded in 1996 as an independent publishing house by Radhika Menon. Menon and Indu Chandrasekhar ran a pre-press service called Tulika to "earn enough money" to publish their own books. Subsequently, Chandrasekhar founded Tulika Books in New Delhi in 1995, and Menon founded Tulika Publishers in Chennai.

The genre of Tulika Publishers is children's literature and illustrations.

Select publications

References 

Publishing companies established in 1996
Book publishing companies of India